The Monon Railroad , also known as the Chicago, Indianapolis, and Louisville Railway  from 1897 to 1971, was an American railroad that operated almost entirely within the state of Indiana. The Monon was merged into the Louisville and Nashville Railroad in 1971, and much of the former Monon right of way is owned today by CSX Transportation. (It also showed zero miles of double track, the longest such Class I railroad in the country.)

Timeline

1847: The New Albany and Salem Railroad (NA&S) is organized with James Brooks as president.
1854: The NA&S trackage stretches from the Ohio River (at New Albany) to Lake Michigan (at Michigan City).
1859: The overextended and struggling NA&S is renamed the Louisville, New Albany and Chicago Railroad (LNA&C).
April 30, 1865: The LNA&C becomes one of twenty railroads to haul Abraham Lincoln's funeral train, its portion being from Lafayette to Michigan City, Indiana.
1873: The LNA&C Railroad is reorganized as the Louisville, New Albany and Chicago Railway.
1881: The LNA&C consolidates with the Chicago and Indianapolis Air Line Railway, and the trackage of the new division is soon extended to reach into its namesake cities.
July 1, 1897: The LNA&C is reorganized as the Chicago, Indianapolis, and Louisville Railway.
1932: The 300 pound (136 kg) Monon Bell is first presented as the trophy of the annual football game between DePauw University and Wabash College.
1946: John W. Barriger III becomes president of the Monon, bringing aggressive plans for modernization.
June 29, 1949: Final day of steam locomotive service, as the Monon becomes one of the first Class I railroads to fully convert to diesel motive power.
January 11, 1956: The CI&L officially adopts its longtime nickname, Monon, as its corporate title.
1959: The Monon's passenger service between Chicago and Indianapolis is discontinued. By 1965, only the Thoroughbred remained, with its single daily roundtrip from Chicago to Louisville.
September 30, 1967: Final day of regularly scheduled passenger train service on the Monon.
March 21, 1968: Merger with Louisville and Nashville Railroad announced to placate the Monon's fear of lost business due to L&N's acquisition of a competing route, the Chicago and Eastern Illinois Railroad.
July 31, 1971: The Monon is merged into the Louisville and Nashville Railroad.
1972-1979: Amtrak operates the Floridian Chicago-Miami service over the former Monon Railroad's tracks in Indiana. With the termination of this service in 1979, Bloomington, Indiana, and the rest of southern Indiana lose passenger railway service.
1999: Portions of the line around Indianapolis are converted to a bicycle and pedestrian trail known as the Monon Trail.
2004: CSX stops using the former Monon Railroad's tracks through Bloomington, Indiana. Over the next decade, Bloomington sections of the tracks are converted to the B-Line Trail (within the city proper) and the Rail-Trail (south of the city).
After 2009, the tracks between Munster and Hammond, Indiana, are removed and the line converted into another section of the Monon Trail.

Colleges served

The Monon served seven colleges and universities along its line:
Purdue University in West Lafayette, Indiana
Wabash College in Crawfordsville, Indiana
DePauw University in Greencastle, Indiana
Indiana University in Bloomington, Indiana
Butler University in Indianapolis, Indiana
St. Joseph's College in Rensselaer, Indiana
West Baden Northwood Institute/College in West Baden Springs, Indiana. 

The university traffic was important enough to the Monon that the railroad used the schools' colors on its rolling stock. The red and white of Wabash College (and similar to the colors of Indiana University) was used on the railroad's passenger equipment, and the black and gold used by both DePauw University and Purdue University adorned the railroad's diesel freight locomotives and later replaced the red and white on passenger equipment as well.

Genealogy
Monon Railroad
Chicago and South Atlantic Railroad 1879
Chicago, Indianapolis, and Louisville Railroad 1956
Chicago and Wabash Valley Railroad 1914
Indianapolis and Louisville Railroad 1916
Louisville, New Albany and Chicago Railroad 1898
Bedford and Bloomfield Railroad 1886
Chicago and Indianapolis Air Line Railway 1883
Indianapolis, Delphi and Chicago Railroad 1881
New Albany and Salem Railroad 1873
Crawfordsville and Wabash Railroad 1852
Orleans, Paoli and Jasper Railway 1886

Monon route

The railroad got the name Monon from the convergence of its main routes in Monon, Indiana. From Monon, the mainlines reached out to Chicago, Louisville, Indianapolis, and Michigan City, Indiana. In Chicago the Monon's passenger trains served Dearborn Station. Branches connected the Louisville mainline to Victoria and French Lick in Indiana.

The Monon's main line ran down the middle of streets in several cities, notably Lafayette, New Albany, and Bedford. It also installed an unusual "home grown" warning signal at many grade crossings; these used a green signal light (similar to and adapted from a standard highway traffic signal) that stayed lit at all times, except when a train was approaching. A sign below or to the side of the signal read, "STOP When Signal Is Out" or "DANGER when light is out cross at your own risk". This design was fail-safe, in that when the signal bulb was burned out, approaching vehicle drivers would assume a train was coming — until they eventually realized there was no train and just a burned-out signal.

The Monon had seven sections. Beginning in the north, Section One was from the Indiana line to Lafayette, passing through the Monon switch in Monon. As a primary passenger route, it connected to Section Four running between Lafayette and Bloomington. This route reached the Ohio River over Section Five from Bloomington to New Albany. From this southern route, Sections Six and Seven were spurs to the west. Section Six served the coal fields between Midland and Clay City, connecting to the main line at Wallace Junction, just south of Cloverdale. Section Seven provided passenger service to the resort hotels in West Baden and French Lick, through a connection at Orleans.

The other primary line, mainly a freight line, included Section Two from Michigan City on Lake Michigan to Monon and then Section three from Monon to Indianapolis. Although each route had its primary traffic type, freight and passengers were carried over all parts of the line.

Section #1
Chicago to Lafayette: The Chicago to Lafayette route is used by Amtrak for the Cardinal and was used by the Hoosier State before that train was discontinued. 
 Chicago – Dearborn Station
 Englewood
 Hammond, here, the Monon entered Indiana and track ownership belonged to the Monon line. From Chicago to Hammond, the Monon utilized trackage rights via the Chicago and Western Indiana.
 Munster
 Dyer
 St. John
 Cedar Lake
 Lowell
 Shelby
 Thayer
 Roselawn
 Fair Oaks
 Rensselaer, home of St. Joseph College

 Pleasant Ridge
 McCoysburg
 Lee 
 Monon, the central switching yard for all trains, and company namesake
 Reynolds
 Chalmers
 Brookston
 Battle Ground
 Lafayette, rail station of Purdue University, located across the Wabash River in West Lafayette

Section #2

Monon to Indianapolis. Section #2 was a freight route between Monon and Indianapolis. The section of the line between Monon and Monticello is still in service. The rest has been completely abandoned and the rails removed. Much of the right-of-way has been returned to neighboring landowners. Where farm fields surround it, evidence of the route has nearly been obliterated as the land has been returned to farming. From 10th Street in Indianapolis, through Carmel and up to State Road 47 in Sheridan, the Monon Trail is now a bike and walking route following the right-of-way.
 Guernsey
 Monticello
 Yeoman
 Delphi, where the Monon High Bridge still stands over Deer Creek Gorge.
 Radnor
 Ockley, south of Ockley station, the viaduct over Wildcat Creek still existed until 2013. It was just north of Owasco and was visible from US 421/SR 39. In 2004, it was damaged by heavy run-offs in Wildcat Creek, which moved the legs of the steel piers out of alignment. It was still standing until the summer of 2013 when it was dismantled by CSX.
 Rossville
 Frankfort
 Kirklin
 Sheridan
 Westfield
 Carmel; see Carmel Monon Depot
 Nora
 Broad Ripple
 Boulevard Station
 Indianapolis, home of Butler University. The Monon used the Indianapolis Union Station in downtown Indianapolis.

Section #3
Michigan City to Monon: This line runs parallel to U.S. 421 as far as Brookston. The Indiana Rail to Trails group is developing a bike route from Michigan City to La Crosse, using the Monon right-of-way, where it still exists. A section south of Michigan City by I-94 has been consumed by a landfill and the bridge over the I-94 and I-80/I-90 have been removed.
 Michigan City
 Otis
 Westville
 Alida
 Haskell
 Wanatah
 South Wanatah
 La Crosse
 Wilders
 San Pierre
 Medaryville. North of Medaryville the tracks have been abandoned and removed. The line is still in service from Medaryville to Monon.
 Francesville
 Monon

Section #4
Lafayette to Bloomington: From Lafayette southward, the Monon follows along U.S. 231 to Crawfordsville. At Crawfordsville, the right-of-way moves eastward of the highway several miles, but continues south to Cloverdale, returning closer to U.S. 231 at Greencastle. Amtrak uses this route south to Crawfordsville and then the old New York Central/Conrail tracks into Indianapolis.
 Lafayette, home to Purdue University
 South Raub
 Romney
 Linden now hosts a museum of the Monon Line in the old station.
 Crawfordsville home of Wabash College
 Ladoga
 Roachdale
 Bainbridge

 Greencastle, home of DePauw University
 Limedale
 Putnamville
 Cloverdale The tracks from Lafayette end here.
 Wallace Jct provided access to the coal fields of Midland, Howesville and Clay City along Section Six of the Monon line.
 Quincy
 Gosport – South of Gosport, the Monon crosses the White River.
 Stinesville is the northern edge of quarry country. From here, south through Bedford and Mitchell, quarries of fine Indiana Limestone exist.
 Adams
 Ellettsville, tracks end here from Bloomington
 Bloomington, home of Indiana University

Section #5
Bloomington to New Albany
 Bloomington, home of Indiana University. Tracks from south of the junction with INRD have been removed and converted into a trail within the Bloomington city limits.
 Clear Creek
 Harrodsburg
 Guthrie
 Murdock
 Bedford Tracks resume here.
 Mitchell
 Orleans is where the junction to Section Seven used to be. It headed southwest towards West Baden and French Lick

 Leipsic
 Campbellsburg
 Hitchcock
 Salem
 Farabee
 Pekin
 Borden
 New Albany

Section #6
Wallace Jct. to Midland (coal fields): With the exception of a short stretch from Midland Junction to Vicksburg, this section has been completely abandoned and the tracks have been removed.
 Wallace Jct
 Cataract
 Jordan
 Patricksburg
 Clay City
 Howesville
 Midland, east entrance to the Indiana coal fields. The active mines are between Linton, Jasonville, and Sullivan.
 Vicksburg
 Victoria has disappeared as a community.

Section #7

This section has been completely abandoned. Tracks remain only in French Lick and are used as an excursion route.
French Lick to Cuzco. A portion of the original track in French Lick and West Baden (between the West Baden Hotel and the Indiana Railway Museum) has been altered and expanded for a trolley service serving various locations of the French Lick Resort and the museum.
 Orleans
 Paoli
 West Baden
 French Lick

Mid-20th century passenger trains
 Thoroughbred, train 5 southbound / train 6 northbound, daily from Chicago, Illinois (Dearborn Station) to Louisville, Kentucky (Union Station), via Monon, Indiana and Lafayette, Indiana.
 Bluegrass, nos. 3/4, night train, with sleeping car service for the above Thoroughbred route.
 Tippecanoe, nos. 11/12, daily from Chicago to Indianapolis' Union Station, via Monon and Frankfort, Indiana.
 Hoosier, nos. 15/16, same route as the Tippecanoe.
 Nos. 49/48, 57/56, daily Michigan City, Indiana to Monon, Indiana service.

The line today

The remains of the line are operated by CSX Transportation. Large segments have been abandoned in recent years: most of the line from Monon southeast to Indianapolis, the line north from Monon to Michigan City, and the line segment between Cloverdale and Bedford (this segment was abandoned due largely to a washout). A portion of the French Lick branch is now home to a railroad museum, with part of the line wired for trolley service.

Between Bedford and Mitchell, CSX owns the line but does not operate any of its own trains. Until 2010, the only service came from trains of the Indiana Rail Road, which in 2006 purchased the former Latta Subdivision of the Canadian Pacific Railway that connected with the former Monon at Bedford. INRD operated over the old Monon from Bedford to Louisville through trackage rights negotiated by the Latta Sub's original owner, The Milwaukee Road, when the L&N took over the Monon. Those trackage rights went from the Milwaukee Road to its buyer, The Soo Line Railroad; a subsidiary of the Canadian Pacific Railway. In May 2010, INRD ended service and removed trackage from the former Monon junction in Bedford to the Naval Surface Warfare Center Crane Division west of Bedford. Consequently, CSX placed the ex-Monon line from Bedford south to Mitchell out of service.

CSX operates trains between Louisville and St. Louis, Missouri, over the Louisville-Mitchell segment; these trains have to make an unusual reverse movement to go from the Monon to the former Baltimore and Ohio Railroad line to St. Louis, owing to an unfavorable track arrangement at the crossing of the lines in Mitchell. As of 2010, CSX has stopped making regular movements over the line, with trains being shifted to the nearby Louisville and Indiana Railroad via a trackage rights agreement.

Amtrak's Cardinal train traverses the former Monon thrice weekly from Crawfordsville to the Indiana state line near Chicago. Station stops along the former Monon include Lafayette, Rensselaer, and Dyer.

The line through Lafayette was relocated in 2000 to an alignment along the Wabash River, parallel to the similarly relocated Norfolk Southern Railway line. Previously, the Monon Line ran down the middle of Fifth Street, with a hotel serving as its passenger station well into the Amtrak era.

The Monon Line has been abandoned in Hammond and Munster north of the junction with the Grand Trunk Western Railroad, but the corridor is planned to be rebuilt as the Northern Indiana Commuter Transportation District West Lake Corridor. Initially running as far south as Munster/Dyer Main Street, long term plans would see services extend as far as Lowell and Valparaiso, Indiana.

Museums

The Indiana Railway Museum in French Lick operates trains south from French Lick to Cuzco, Indiana, out of the former Monon (Union) depot in French Lick, Indiana.

The Monon Connection, which opened in 2005. is on U.S. 421 north of Monon.

Located in a disused Monon railroad station, the Linden Railroad Museum is owned and operated by the Linden-Madison Township Historical Society. In 1852, the Michigan City, Salem and New Albany Railroad cut through Montgomery County. The old stage road between Crawfordsville and Linden was given to the railroad as an inducement to get it to build through Linden. 1852 also saw the building of the first Linden depot, on a site behind the present day post office. The building was moved to the current location in 1881 when the Toledo, St. Louis and Western Railroad was built through Linden, crossing the Monon at this location.

The John Hay Center in Salem has the Depot Railroad Station Museum, honoring the Monon. It has also been the home of the Monon Railroad Historical/Technical Society since summer 2012.

The Kentucky Railway Museum in New Haven, Kentucky, displays Monon's Diesel Engine No. 32, an Electro-Motive Division (EMD) BL2 model, in its original black and gold paint scheme.

The French Lick West Baden Museum in French Lick acquired a major Monon Railroad Artifact collection in 2021 that is on display from November 2022 through mid-2023.

See also

The Boilermaker Special, the official mascot of Purdue University in West Lafayette, Indiana. A brass bell and steam whistle were donated to Purdue University by the Monon Railroad in 1940 for installation on the original Boilermaker Special I. The brass bell is still in use on the current Boilermaker Special VII.

References

16. Rhymed Americana by William O. Thomson, 1967. Poem "The Monon Route."

Further reading
Dolzall, Gary W., and Dolzall, Stephen F. Monon: The Hoosier Line, Interurban Press (1987).
Hilton, George. Monon Route, Howell-North Books (1978).
Longest, David, "The Monon Railroad in Southern Indiana", 2008, Arcadia Publishing

External links

Monon Railroad Historical-Technical Society
List and Family Trees of North American Railroads
Tom Kepshire's Bygone Places Along the "Hoosier Line" site
Bygone Places Along The Monon
Monon Railroad Company collection, Rare Books and Manuscripts, Indiana State Library

 
Predecessors of the Louisville and Nashville Railroad
Former Class I railroads in the United States
Defunct companies based in Chicago
Defunct Illinois railroads
Defunct Indiana railroads
Defunct Kentucky railroads
Railroads in the Chicago metropolitan area
Transportation in Louisville, Kentucky
Transportation in Indianapolis
Michigan City, Indiana
Railway companies established in 1956
Railway companies disestablished in 1971
Predecessors of CSX Transportation
American companies established in 1956